Padikkadavan is a 1985 Indian Tamil-language action drama film, starring Sivaji Ganesan, Rajinikanth and Ambika. It is directed by Rajasekhar. The film was produced by Kannada actor Ravichandran along with his father N. Veeraswamy. It is a remake of the Hindi film Khud-Daar (1982).

The story is about a man who strives hard to make his younger brother study. The two brothers are the step-brothers of Rajasekhar. The younger brother of Rajendran after distressing from him finally joins with him. All three of them finally join after certain conviction regarding a death. The film was a blockbuster and run for more than 250 days at the box office.It was biggest hit & highest  grossing film in 1985. This film is considered one of the biggest hits for Rajinikanth during the 1980s.

Plot 
Rajasekhar is the loving elder stepbrother of Rajendran aka Raja and Ramu. After his elder step brother marriage, his wife Radha sends his brothers out when he goes to Madras. After some struggle the two young brothers were adopted by Rahim, a Muslim. Rajendran, the older of the two, toils and becomes a taxi driver to educate and bring up his brother. As a taxi driver, he does what's right, such as stopping drug dealers. There he meets Mary a Girl who is smuggling drugs and alcohol as a pregnant woman. After some time She change and falls for Raja. Raja believes His brother, to be the innocent and well-educated man, strays and gets mixed up with some wrong-doers. He marries a girl Manju from a wealthy family. The girl's uncle Chakravarthy is a smuggler who sells drugs using his older brother's lorries. Chakravarthy later kills his brother and blames Rajendran. Rajasekhar, the presiding judge, realizes that Rajendran is his long-lost brother. He then proceeds to have a heart attack but then researches all night and returns as a lawyer to save him and proves that Chakravarthy is the one who murdered his own brother. A fight ensues between Chakravarthy and Raja Raja defeats Chakravarthy. Radha apologies for her old attitude with Raja and Ramu.

Cast 
 Sivaji Ganesan as Rajasekhar
 Rajinikanth as Rajendran
 Ambika as Mary
 Ramya Krishnan as Manju
 Vijay Babu as Ramachandran
 Jaishankar as Chakravarthy
 Vadivukkarasi as Radha, Rajasekhar's wife
 Nagesh as Rahim
 Poornam Viswanathan as Vedhachalam
 Thengai Srinivasan as Ramanathan
 Janagaraj as Kabali
 Senthamarai as Advocate
 Indira as Faritha
 Gundu Kalyanam as Ramu's friend

Soundtrack 
The music was composed by Ilaiyaraaja.

Reception
Jayamanmadhan of Kalki praised Rajinikanth for his fight scenes, Ganesan for controlled acting, Ilaiyaraaja's music as melodious with praise directed towards the song "Oorai Therinjukitten" for its tune, lyrics and picturisation but felt Ambika was there only for glamour. He concluded the review saying due to the presence of Rajinikanth, the film looks brighter and also added the film which is backed up by great music, strong story will satisfy all audiences and the film will easily succeed.

References

External links 
 

1980s Tamil-language films
1985 films
Films directed by Rajasekhar (director)
Films scored by Ilaiyaraaja
Indian action drama films
Tamil remakes of Hindi films